The 2013 Ontario Liberal Party leadership election, held on January 26, 2013, at Maple Leaf Gardens in Toronto, elected Kathleen Wynne as the new leader of the Ontario Liberal Party, replacing Dalton McGuinty, who announced his resignation on October 15, 2012. With the Liberals forming the Ontario government, Wynne consequently became Premier of Ontario. After leading a minority government for 18 months, she called an election after the defeat of her government's budget and she led her party to a renewed majority government in June 2014.

Background
Premier Dalton McGuinty announced his pending resignation as leader of the Liberal Party on October 15, 2012, citing a desire to bring new blood to the party leadership. McGuinty also, citing the political "logjam" in Ontario, prorogued the Legislative Assembly.

Rules and procedures
Under the procedure outlined by the party's constitution, the leader was to be chosen in a traditional delegated leadership convention in which up to 2,283 delegates were eligible to vote, made up of 1,712 elected delegates (16 elected by proportional representation in each of the 107 provincial riding associations), 419 ex officio delegates (current and former Liberal MPPs, defeated candidates from the last election, riding association presidents, party executive officers and other party officials, and federal Liberal MPs for Ontario) 144 youth delegates from 18 campus clubs and eight delegates representing the Women's Commission. Riding delegates ran on the slate of a leadership candidate or as independents, in the case of the former they were required to vote for that candidate on the first ballot but were free to change their support subsequently. Balloting at convention continued until one candidate received a majority of ballots cast.

There was a $50,000 entry fee and $500,000 spending limit not including the 25% of all money raised by candidates which had to be turned over to the party in order to pay for the convention. Candidates were not permitted to accumulate more than $100,000 in debt. Nomination papers had to be signed by at least 250 party members. The registration fee for delegates was between $249 and $599.

44,421 party members were eligible to vote in the selection of delegates. Of these, less than 15,000 had been members when McGuinty announced his departure; 27,206 were recruited by the leadership campaigns before November 24.

Timeline

 December 1, 1996 – Dalton McGuinty wins the leadership election to succeed Lyn McLeod.
 October 6, 2011 – The general election returns the Liberals to power but reduces them to 53 seats in the legislature, one short of a majority.
 September 6, 2012 – By-elections are held in the ridings of Kitchener—Waterloo and Vaughan. The Liberals had hoped to win both seats in order to secure a majority; they retain Vaughan but place third in Kitchener-Waterloo which is won by the NDP.
 September 29, 2012 – The Ontario Liberal Party's Annual General Meeting endorses Dalton McGuinty's leadership of the party with the support of 86% of delegates.
 October 2, 2012 – The opposition parties combine, in committee, to pass a rare contempt motion against Energy Minister Chris Bentley over the government's decision to cancel two gas plants prior to the 2011 election at a cost of $230 million. The opposition contends that the sale occurred in order to help the Liberals retain several seats and that Bentley has not complied with a directive by the Speaker to release all documents related to the decision.
 October 15, 2012 – Dalton McGuinty announces that he will resign as Liberal Party leader and Premier of Ontario as soon as the party holds a leadership convention. McGuinty also prorogues the legislature.
 October 21, 2012 – Liberal Party executive meets to decide on a date for the leadership election and rules government the process.
 October 28, 2012 – Liberal Party executive meets to choose a venue for the convention.
 November 23, 2012, 5 pm ET (UTC−05:00) – Deadline for candidates to pay $50,000 entry fee and file nomination papers signed by at least 250 party members. Membership cut-off date for eligibility to vote for delegates.
 December 1, 2012, 1 pm ET – Ingersoll Leadership Debate
 December 9, 2012, 1 pm ET – Thunder Bay Leadership Debate
 December 18, 2012, 7 pm ET – Ottawa Leadership Debate
 January 6, 2013, 1 pm ET – Durham Region Leadership Debate
 January 9, 2013, 7 pm ET – Toronto Leadership Debate
 January 12–13, 2013 – Delegate selection meetings will be held in all 107 Ontario ridings.
 January 25, 2013 – convention opens
 January 26, 2013 – leadership election
 January 27, 2013 – convention ends

Candidates

Eric Hoskins

Background: MPP for  St. Paul's (2009–2018); Minister of Citizenship and Immigration (2010–2011); Minister of Children and Youth Services (2011–2012); Former President of War Child Canada
Date campaign launched: November 13, 2012  
Campaign website: 
Supporters
MPPs: (3) Amrit Mangat (Mississauga—Brampton South; Tracy MacCharles (Pickering—Scarborough East), Margarett Best (Scarborough—Guildwood and Minister of Consumer Services)
Former MPPs: (4) Roy McMurtry (Eglinton 1975–1985, former Progressive Conservative cabinet minister), Bob Wong (Fort York 1987–1990, former Liberal cabinet minister), Alvin Curling (Scarborough North and Scarborough—Rouge River 1985–2005, former Liberal cabinet minister and Speaker of the Legislative Assembly of Ontario), Dianne Poole (Eglinton 1987–1995)
Federal politicians: (2) John Turner, former Prime Minister of Canada (1984), Bob Speller (MP for Haldimand—Norfolk—Brant, 1988–2004 and cabinet minister)
Municipal politicians:
Other prominent individuals: (4) K'naan, Raine Maida, former Ontario Liberal Party Presidents Gord Phaneuf and Mike Eizenga
Members signed up: Not disclosed
Elected delegates: 104

Gerard Kennedy

Background: Candidate for the Ontario Liberal leadership in 1996; MPP for Parkdale—High Park (1996–2006); Minister of Education (2003–2006); Candidate for the federal Liberal leadership in 2006; MP for Parkdale—High Park (2008–2011)
Date campaign launched: November 12, 2012 
Campaign website: 
Supporters
MPPs: (4) Bob Delaney (Mississauga—Streetsville); Kim Craitor (Niagara Falls); Shafiq Qaadri (Etobicoke North); Vic Dhillon (Brampton West)
Former MPPs: (4) Joseph Cordiano (York South—Weston 1985–2006, former cabinet minister); George Smitherman (Toronto Centre 1999–2010, former cabinet minister); Steve Peters (Elgin—Middlesex—London 1999–2011, former cabinet minister); Kuldip Kular (Bramalea—Gore—Malton 2003–2011)
Federal politicians: Kirsty Duncan (Etobicoke North)
Municipal politicians:
Other prominent individuals:
Members signed up: 5,000
Elected delegates: 257

Sandra Pupatello

Background: Former MPP for  Windsor West (1995–2011); Minister of Community and Social Services (2003–2006); Minister of Education (2006); Minister of Economic Development and Innovation (2006–2008; 2009–2011); Minister of International Trade and Investment (2008–2009); Director of business and global markets at PricewaterhouseCoopers (2011–2012)
Date campaign launched:  November 8, 2012
Campaign website: 
Supporters
MPPs: (22) Dwight Duncan (Windsor—Tecumseh, Deputy Premier); Bob Chiarelli (Ottawa West—Nepean, Minister of Transport); Teresa Piruzza (Windsor West); Bill Mauro (Thunder Bay—Atikokan); Phil McNeely (Ottawa—Orléans); Helena Jaczek (Oak Ridges—Markham) Joe Dickson (Ajax—Pickering); Michael Chan (Markham—Unionville); John Milloy (Kitchener Centre, Minister of Community and Social Services); Madeleine Meilleur (Ottawa—Vanier, Minister of Community Safety and Correctional Services); David Orazietti (Sault Ste. Marie); Grant Crack (Glengarry—Prescott—Russell); Mike Colle (Eglinton—Lawrence); Laura Albanese (York South—Weston); Brad Duguid (Scarborough Centre, Minister of Economic Development and Innovation); Michael Gravelle (Thunder Bay—Superior North, Minister of Natural Resources); Jeff Leal (Peterborough); Bas Balkissoon (Scarborough—Rouge River); Rick Bartolucci (Sudbury); Laurel Broten (Etobicoke—Lakeshore); Donna Cansfield (Etobicoke Centre); Dipika Damerla (Mississauga East—Cooksville)
Picked up after first ballot: Amrit Mangat (Mississauga—Brampton South); Harinder Takhar (Mississauga—Erindale)
Former MPPs: (13) Carol Mitchell (Huron—Bruce 2003–2011, former cabinet minister); Jean-Marc Lalonde (Glengarry—Prescott—Russell 1995–2011); Pat Hoy (Chatham-Kent—Essex 1995–2011); Robert Nixon (Brant/Brant--Oxford--Norfolk/Brant--Haldimand 1962–1991, Provincial Treasurer 1985–1990, Liberal leader 1967–1976); Sean Conway (Renfrew North/Renfrew—Nipissing—Pembroke 1975–2003, Education Minister in Peterson cabinet); David Caplan (Don Valley East 1997 – 2011); Don Boudria (Prescott and Russell 1981 – 1984); Eric Cunningham (Wentworth North 1975 – 1984); Murray Elston (Huron—Bruce 1981–1994, former cabinet minister and interim leader); Tim Murphy (St. George—St. David 1993–1995, former party president); Richard Patten (Ottawa Centre 1987–1990, 1995–2007); Mario Racco (Thornhill 2003–2007); Elinor Caplan (Oriole, 1985–1997, former provincial and federal health minister) 
Federal politicians: (3) Belinda Stronach (Newmarket—Aurora 2004–2008, former cabinet minister); John McCallum (Markham—Unionville, former cabinet minister); Joe Volpe (Eglinton—Lawrence 1988–2011, former cabinet minister)
Picked up after first ballot: John Turner, former Prime Minister of Canada (1984)
Municipal politicians: (2) Gary McNamara, Mayor of Tecumseh, Ontario  Frank Scarpitti, Mayor of Markham, Ontario
Other prominent individuals:
Members signed up: 4,000
Elected delegates: 504

Charles Sousa

Background: MPP for  Mississauga South (2007–2018); Minister of Labour (2010–2011); Minister of Citizenship and Immigration (2011–2012)
Date campaign launched:  November 10, 2012
Campaign website: 
Supporters
MPPs: (2) Lorenzo Berardinetti (Scarborough Southwest); Soo Wong (Scarborough—Agincourt)
Former MPPs:
Federal politicians: (1) John David Maloney (Welland 1993–2008)
Municipal politicians: (3) Hazel McCallion (Mayor of Mississauga - later moved to support Wynne on the convention floor), Ana Bailão, Toronto City Councillor, Ward 18 Davenport, Frank Monteiro, Cambridge City Councillor, Ward 7
Other prominent individuals: (2) Past Liberal candidate and journalist Nerene Virgin, past Liberal candidate and journalist Indira Naidoo-Harris,
Members signed up: 6,000
Elected delegates: 198

Harinder Takhar

Background: MPP for Mississauga—Erindale (2003–2018); Minister of Transportation (2003–2006; Minister of Consumer Services (2006–2009); Minister of Government Services (2009–2012)

Date campaign announced:  November 22, 2012
Campaign website: 
Supporters
MPPs: 
Former MPPs:
Federal politicians:
Municipal politicians: Bonnie Crombie, Mississauaga city councillor and former MP
Other prominent individuals:
Members signed up: 4,000
Elected delegates: 244

Kathleen Wynne

Background: MPP for Don Valley West (2003–present), Minister of Education (2006–2010); Minister of Transportation (2010–2011); Minister of Municipal Affairs and Housing and Aboriginal Affairs (2011–2012); Toronto District School Board Trustee Ward 8 (2000–2003)
Date campaign launched:  November 5, 2012
Campaign website: 

Supporters
MPPs: (10) Michael Coteau (Don Valley East); John Gerretsen (Kingston and the Islands, Attorney General); Linda Jeffrey (Brampton—Springdale, Minister of Labour); Deb Matthews, (London North Centre, Minister of Health); Ted McMeekin (Ancaster—Dundas—Flamborough—Westdale, Minister of Agriculture); Reza Moridi (Richmond Hill); Liz Sandals, (Guelph); Mario Sergio (York West); David Zimmer, (Willowdale); Glen Murray, (Toronto Centre, former Minister of Colleges and Universities)  
Picked up after first ballot: Margarett Best (Scarborough—Guildwood and Minister of Consumer Services); Eric Hoskins (St. Paul's); Tracy MacCharles (Pickering—Scarborough East)
Picked up after second ballot: Vic Dhillon (Brampton West); Shafiq Qaadri (Etobicoke North); Charles Sousa (Mississauga South); Soo Wong (Scarborough—Agincourt)
Former MPPs: (14) Stuart Smith (Hamilton West 1975–1982, former Ontario Liberal leader); Charles Beer (York North 1987–1995, former cabinet minister); Marie Bountrogianni (Hamilton Mountain 1999–2007, former cabinet minister); Mike Brown (Algoma-Manitoulin 1987–2011, former Speaker of the Ontario Legislature); Michael Bryant (St. Paul's 1999–2009, former Attorney General); Aileen Carroll (Barrie 2007–11, former cabinet minister, former MP Barrie 1997–2006, former federal cabinet minister); Sheila Copps (Hamilton Centre 1981–84, former MP Hamilton East 1984–2004, former Deputy Prime Minister and federal cabinet minister), Mary Anne Chambers (Scarborough East 2003–07, former cabinet minister), Christine Hart (York East 1986–1990, former cabinet minister); Lyn McLeod (Thunder Bay—Atikokan 1987–2003, former cabinet minister and Leader of the Ontario Liberal Party); Jennifer Mossop (Stoney Creek 2003–07); Dave Neumann (Brantford 1987–1990, former Mayor of Brantford), Monique Smith (Nipissing 2003–11, former cabinet minister); John Wilkinson, (Perth—Wellington 2003–2011, former Minister of the Environment)  
Federal politicians: (11) Bill Graham (Toronto Centre 1995–2007, former interim Liberal Party leader, foreign minister, defence minister); Barry Campbell (St. Paul's 1993–97); David Collenette (Don Valley East 1993–2004, former cabinet minister); John Godfrey (Don Valley West 1993–2008, former cabinet minister); Ted Hsu (Kingston and the Islands);  Lorna Marsden (Senator 1984–92)); Dennis Mills (Toronto—Danforth 1988–2004); Rob Oliphant (Don Valley West 2008–11), Paddy Torsney (Burlington 1993–2006); Bryon Wilfert (Richmond Hill 1997–2011); Senator Nancy Ruth (Conservative – Cluny, Ontario); 
Municipal politicians: (2) Sharon Barkley (Milton councillor), Shelley Carroll (Toronto Councillor for Ward 33 Don Valley East); John Sewell (former Mayor of Toronto 1978–1980)
Other prominent individuals: Anne Golden, former president of United Way of Greater Toronto and Conference Board of Canada
Members signed up: 8,000
Elected delegates: 463

Withdrew prior to convention

Glen Murray

Background: MPP for Toronto Centre (2010–present), Minister of Research and Innovation (2010–2011); Minister of Training, Colleges and Universities (2011–2012); CEO of the Canadian Urban Institute (2007–2010); Mayor of Winnipeg (1998–2004)
Date campaign launched:  November 4, 2012
Date of withdrawal: January 10, 2013
Endorsed: Kathleen Wynne
Campaign website: 
Supporters
MPPs: (1) Kevin Flynn (Oakville)
Former MPPs: (1) Elinor Caplan (Oriole 1985–1997, former provincial and federal cabinet minister)
Federal politicians:
Municipal politicians:
Other prominent individuals:
Members signed up: 3,000

Declined to run
Rick Bartolucci, Minister of Northern Development and Mines, MPP for Sudbury.
Chris Bentley, Minister of Energy and MPP for London West – retiring from politics
Jim Bradley, Minister of Environment and MPP for St. Catharines
Laurel Broten, Minister of Education and MPP for Etobicoke—Lakeshore
Michael Bryant, former Attorney-General
David Caplan, former Minister of Health and Long-Term Care (2007–2009)
Bob Chiarelli, Minister of Transportation, Minister of Infrastructure and MPP for Ottawa West—Nepean
Brad Duguid, Minister of Economic Development and MPP for Scarborough Centre
Dwight Duncan, Deputy Premier, Finance Minister and MPP  for Windsor—Tecumseh – retiring from politics
John Gerretsen, Attorney-General and MPP for Kingston and the Islands
Deb Matthews, Minister of Health and Long-term Care and MPP for London North Centre
Yasir Naqvi, MPP for Ottawa Centre and President of the Ontario Liberal Party.
David Orazietti, MPP for Sault Ste. Marie.
Frank Scarpitti, Mayor of Markham, Ontario
George Smitherman, former Deputy Premier
John Wilkinson, former Minister of the Environment

Opinion polling

All Ontarians

Liberal supporters only

Results

Delegate selection meetings
A total of 1,857 delegates were elected from Ontario's 107 electoral districts (1,712), and from the Ontario Liberal Party's 18 youth and 8 women's clubs (141). The delegates were selected over the weekend of January 12–13, with 896 elected on January 12 from the 905 region and northern and eastern Ontario and 957 elected on January 13 from Toronto and southwestern Ontario. Most of these delegates elected were pledged to support one of the leadership candidates on the first ballot at the January 25 convention, while some were independents who could vote for whomever they chose at the convention. An additional 419 ex-officio delegates were eligible to vote at the convention by virtue of party and elected offices they have held.

Convention results

 = Eliminated from next round
 = Withdrew nomination
 = Winner

Takhar endorsed Pupatello before the second ballot voting took place, but after the deadline to drop off the ballot.

Notes

References

2013 elections in Canada
 Liberal Party
2013 in Toronto
2013
2013
Ontario Liberal Party leadership election